The Zaporizhzhia Pylon Triple is a set of two triples of  tall electricity pylons extending over the Dnieper river standing on a 27m rock in Zaporizhzhia, Ukraine. They are used for the transport of electricity generated at the Dnieper Hydroelectric Station over a span of 900 metres from Khortytsia island to the east bank of the Dnieper. The two triples are an unofficial landmark of Zaporizhzhia.

History
The powerline crossing, which was one of the first of its kind in the USSR, was built between 1930 and 1932. In World War II both sets of towers were destroyed or dismantled.

Between 1945 and 1949 the pylons were rebuilt using the old foundations.  However, only three towers were built at each end of the span.  The unused foundation, on which the fourth tower on Khortytsia island stood, still exists.

Configuration

Each pylon has a single crossarm designed to carry 6 conductors.  However, only 4 conductors, two at the edge and two near the pylon, are installed there.  From the middle of each crossbar, half a support structure runs down to the gangway.  At this point on the underside of the gangway the insulator carrying the middle conductor is fixed.

Although the triples are capable of carrying 18 conductors for 6 150 kV-circuits, there are only 5 circuits at present.  A sixth circuit runs parallel to the triple on a new tubular steel monopolar powerline tower.

All towers of both triples are painted red and white and equipped with a ladder.

Coordinates

References

External links 

Diagrams of the pylons 
Photographs of the pylons 

Towers in Ukraine
Electric power infrastructure in Ukraine
Powerline river crossings
Buildings and structures in Zaporizhzhia